Cyrenidae is a family of clams in the order Venerida.

Genera
Genera within this family include:
 Batissa Gray, 1853
 Corbicula Megerle von Mühlfeld, 1811
 Cyanocyclas Blainville, 1818
 Geloina Gray, 1842
 Polymesoda Rafinesque, 1820
 Villorita Gray, 1833

Taxa brought into synonymy
 †Cyrenida: synonym of Corbicula Megerle von Mühlfeld, 1811
 Subfamily Polymesodinae Habe, 1977: synonym of Cyrenidae Gray, 1847

References

 Bieler R., Carter J.G. & Coan E.V. 2010: Classification of Bivalve families. pp. 113–133, in: Bouchet P. & Rocroi J.-P. (2010), Nomenclator of Bivalve Families. Malacologia, 52(2): 1-184.
 (redescription) Coan, E. V.; Valentich-Scott, P. (2012). Bivalve seashells of tropical West America. Marine bivalve mollusks from Baja California to northern Peru. 2 vols, 1258 pp.

 
Bivalve families